Ihaste is the suburban neighbourhood of Tartu. It is located about 4 km southeast of the centre of the town, south of Annelinn, on the left bank of Emajõgi River.

See also
Anne Nature Reserve

References

External links
Ihaste Riding and Leisure Centre 
Ihaste arboretum 

Tartu